Uthman Muhammad (born 1 March 1989) is a Trinidadian cricketer who represents the Trinidad and Tobago national team in West Indian domestic cricket. He made his first-class debut for Trinidad and Tobago in the 2015–16 Regional Four Day Competition on 4 December 2015.

References

External links
 

1989 births
Living people
Trinidad and Tobago cricketers
Cricketers from Port of Spain